Post-Internet is a 21st-century art movement involving works that are derived from the Internet or its effects on aesthetics, culture and society.

Definition
Post-Internet is a loosely-defined term that was coined by artist/curator Marisa Olson in an attempt to describe her practice. It emerged from mid-2000s discussions about Internet art by Gene McHugh (author of a blog titled "Post-Internet"), and Artie Vierkant (artist, and creator of Image Object sculpture series). The movement itself grew out of Internet Art (or Net Art). According to the UCCA Center for Contemporary Art in Beijing, rather than referring "to a time “after” the internet", the term refers to "an internet state of mind". Eva Folks of AQNB described wrote that it "references one so deeply embedded in and propelled by the internet that the notion of a world or culture without or outside it becomes increasingly unimaginable, impossible."

The term is controversial and the subject of much criticism in the art community. Art in Americas Brian Droitcour in 2014 opined that the term fails to describe the form of the works, instead "alluding only to a hazy contemporary condition and the idea of art being made in the context of digital technology." According to a 2015 article in The New Yorker, the term describes "the practices of artists [whose] artworks move fluidly between spaces, appearing sometimes on a screen, other times in a gallery." Fast Companys Carey Dunne summarizes they are "artists who are inspired by the visual cacophony of the web" and notes that "mediums from Second Life portraits to digital paintings on silk to 3-D-printed sculpture" are used.

There is theoretical overlap with writer and artist James Bridle's term New Aesthetic. Ian Wallace of Artspace writes that "the influential blog The New Aesthetic, run since May 2011 by Bridle, is a pioneering institution in the post-Internet movement" and concludes that "much of the energy around the New Aesthetic seems, now, to have filtered over into the "post-Internet" conversation." Post-Internet art is also discussed by Katja Novitskova as being a part of 'New Materialism'.

Wallace considers the Post-Internet term to stand for "a new aesthetic era," moving "beyond making work dependent on the novelty of the Web to using its tools to tackle other subjects". He notes that the post-Internet generation "frequently uses digital strategies to create objects that exist in the real world." Or as Louis Doulas writes in Within Post-Internet, Part One (2011): "There is a difference then, in an art that chooses to exist outside of a browser window and an art that chooses to stay within it."

Influence

The movement spearheaded microgenres and subcultures such as seapunk and vaporwave. In the early 2010s, "post-Internet" was popularly associated with the musician Grimes. Grimes used the term to describe her work at a time when post-Internet concepts were not typically discussed in mainstream music arenas. Amarco referred to Yung Lean as "by and large a product of the internet and a leading example of a generation of youths who garner fame through social media."

Exhibitions 

There have been a number of significant group art shows explicitly exploring Post-Internet themes. There was a 2014 exhibition called Art Post-Internet at Beijing's Ullens Center for Contemporary Art, which ARTnews named one of the "most art exhibitions of the 2010s" which "set out to encapsulate the budding movement." MoMA curated Ocean of Images in 2015, a show "probing the effects of an image-based post-Internet reality." The 2016 9th Berlin Biennale, titled The Present in Drag, curated by the art collective DIS, is described as a Post-Internet exhibition. Other examples include:

 Raster Raster, Aran Cravey Gallery, Los Angeles, 2014
2015 Triennial: Surround Audience at New Museum, New York, 2015
 Zero Zero, Annka Kulty Gallery, London, 2016

Notable artists 

 AIDS-3D (Daniel Keller and Nik Kosmas)
Cory Arcangel
 Kai (Kari) Altmann
Petra Cortright, whose work includes YouTube video work and digital paintings. She was included in "Raster Raster" and the 9th Berlin Biennale
DIS
 Aleksandra Domanović
Parker Ito
Rachel de Joode
 Oliver Laric
Katja Novitskova whose work focuses on issues of technology, evolutionary processes, digital imagery and corporate aesthetics and was included in the 9th Berlin Biennale
Seth Price 
Bunny Rogers
Jon Rafman, whose work was included in the 9th Berlin Biennale
Ryder Ripps
 Timur Si-Qin
Molly Soda, who co-curated and included her own work in "Zero Zero"
Hito Steyerl
Ryan Trecartin and Lizzie Fitch, whose work was included in the 9th Berlin Biennale and who co-curated the New Museum's 2015 triennial Surround Audience
Brad Troemel, Joshua Citarella, and Molly Soda
Amalia Ulman, whose work was included in the 9th Berlin Biennale
Kalup Linzy

Gallery

See also

References

Further reading
 Novitskova, Katja. Post internet survival guide 2010. Berlin: Revolver Publishing, 2011.  
McHugh, Gene. Post Internet. Notes on the Internet and Art 12.29.09 > 09.05.10, Brescia: Link Editions, 2011.

External links
 An interview with Martijn Hendriks & Katja Novitskova
"The New Aesthetic and its Politics"
 
Reconstruction of Gene McHugh's 'Post-Internet' blog, 2009–10

Theories of aesthetics
Metanarratives
Internet culture
2000s in art
2010s in art